Tommy Turner may refer to:

 Tommy Turner (athlete) (born 1947), American former sprinter
 T. J. Turner (end) (Tommy James Turner, 1963–2009), American football player
 Tommy Turner (politician) (born 1952), American politician
 Tommy Turner (footballer) (born 1963), Scottish footballer

See also
 Thomas Turner (disambiguation)